This is a list of the best-selling singles in 1999 in Japan, as reported by Oricon.

References

1999 in Japanese music
1999
Oricon
Japanese music-related lists